is a railway station in the city of Kiryū, Gunma, Japan, operated by the  third sector railway company Watarase Keikoku Railway.

Lines

Station layout
The station has a two opposed side platforms connected by a level crossing. The station is unattended.

History
It was renamed to its present name on 1 June 1918.

Passenger statistics
In fiscal 2019, the station was used by an average of 99 passengers daily (boarding passengers only).

Surrounding area
 former Mizunuma Village Hall
 Mizunuma Post Office

See also
 List of railway stations in Japan

References

External links

   Station information (Watarase Keikoku) 

Railway stations in Gunma Prefecture
Railway stations in Japan opened in 1912
Kiryū, Gunma